Giovanni Battista Fornovo (1521–1575) was an Italian architect, active in a late-Renaissance style in Parma.

Around 1560, he helped design the church of the Santissima Annunziata, Parma while working as the court architect for Ottavio Farnese, Duke of Parma and Piacenza.

References

Architects from Parma
16th-century Italian architects
Renaissance architects
1525 births
1575 deaths